Stará Voda may refer to places:

Czech Republic
Stará Voda (Cheb District), a municipality and village in the Karlovy Vary Region
Stará Voda (Hradec Králové District), a municipality and village in the Hradec Králové Region
Stará Voda, a village and part of Horčápsko in the Central Bohemian Region
Stará Voda, a village and part of Světlá Hora in the Moravian-Silesian Region

Slovakia
Stará Voda, Gelnica District, a municipality and village